Bridestowe and Sourton Common, also known as Common to Bridestowe and Sourton and Lands common to the Parishes of Bridestowe and Sourton, is a civil parish in the district of West Devon, Devon, England. It is surrounded by the parishes of Okehampton Hamlets, Dartmoor Forest, Lydford, Bridestowe and Sourton.

History 
It was formerly an extra-parochial area.

References

Civil parishes in Devon
Borough of West Devon